Once Upon a Time in Wonderland is an American fantasy-drama series that aired on ABC from October 10, 2013, to April 3, 2014. It was created by Edward Kitsis, Adam Horowitz, Zack Estrin, and Jane Espenson for ABC Studios. The program is a spin-off of the ABC series Once Upon a Time and aired on ABC at 8:00 pm Eastern/7:00 pm Central on Thursday nights in the 2013–14 television season beginning October 10, 2013.

The series is based on the Lewis Carroll novels Alice's Adventures in Wonderland (1865) and Through the Looking-Glass (1871) but with a different twist from the other adaptations, and takes place in the same universe as Once Upon a Time in present-day Wonderland, with flashbacks to Wonderland before it fell prey to a dark curse. It follows the same setting as the parent series, including the use of Disney and Lost allusions. In addition, the series features occasional crossover events with Once Upon a Time that involve connections with the characters that are trapped in Storybrooke, Maine.

The series received mixed to positive reviews from critics, who praised its cast, visuals, and narrative, but criticized the muddled plot. On March 27, 2014, it was revealed that the series would be ending after one season, with the series finale airing on April 3, 2014. Actor Michael Socha, in his Once Upon a Time in Wonderland as Will Scarlet / Knave of Hearts, transferred to the fourth season of Once Upon a Time as a series regular.

Premise
After the apparent death of her true love Cyrus, Alice returns home to Victorian England where she is placed in an asylum, and her doctors aim to cure her with a treatment that will make her forget everything about her tales in Wonderland. However, she is rescued by the Knave of Hearts and the White Rabbit and brought back to Wonderland to save Cyrus, who is spotted alive. Now back in Wonderland, Alice must evade the plots of Jafar and the Red Queen, all while dealing with the whimsical dangers of Wonderland, including the infamous Jabberwocky, and in a crazy and dangerous way to find her true love.

Cast and characters

Main
 Sophie Lowe as Alice
 Michael Socha as Will Scarlet / Knave of Hearts / White King
 Peter Gadiot as Cyrus
 Emma Rigby as Anastasia / Red Queen / White Queen
 Naveen Andrews as Jafar
 John Lithgow as Percy the White Rabbit (voice)

Recurring
 Jonny Coyne as Dr Lydgate
 Ben Cotton as Tweedledum
 Heather Doerksen as Sarah
 Keith David as the Cheshire Cat (voice)
 Matty Finochio as Tweedledee
 Brian George as the Sultan / Old Prisoner
 Whoopi Goldberg as Mrs Rabbit (voice)
 Lauren McKnight as Elizabeth "Lizard"
 Iggy Pop as the Caterpillar (voice)
 Zuleikha Robinson as Amara
 Peta Sergeant as the Jabberwocky
 Garwin Sanford as Red King
 Shaun Smyth as Edwin, Alice's father

Guests
 Lee Arenberg as Leroy / Grumpy
 Jessy Schram as Cinderella / Ashley Boyd
 Barbara Hershey as Cora / Queen of Hearts
 Sean Maguire as Robin Hood
 Kristin Bauer van Straten as Maleficent (voice)
 Sarah-Jane Redmond as Anastasia's mother
 Millie Bobby Brown as young Alice
 Jason Burkart as Little John
 Michael P. Northey as Friar Tuck

Production and casting
In February 2013, Kitsis and Horowitz, along with producers Zack Estrin and Jane Espenson, began development on a spin-off of Once Upon a Time which would focus on Lewis Carroll's Wonderland. It was initially reported that the show would recast Sebastian Stan's Mad Hatter due to his commitment to the Marvel Cinematic Universe, but Kitsis later revealed the next month that due to fan backlash and respect for Stan's performance, the character would not be recast and the series would proceed without the character.

The show includes new characters, such as "Amahl, described as exotic, soulful and optimistic; and The Knave, a sardonic adventurer, a man of action, a loner and a heart-breaker." On March 28, 2013, it was announced that Sophie Lowe would portray the lead role of Alice. It was also announced that Peter Gadiot would play her love interest, Cyrus, who has "a background". Michael Socha will portray the Knave of Hearts. Barbara Hershey, who has appeared as Cora, the Queen of Hearts, in the main series, may also appear in this spin-off reprising the same role in back stories . Also, during the month of April, Paul Reubens was cast as the voice of the White Rabbit and Emma Rigby was cast as the Red Queen.

On May 10, 2013, ABC announced that it had greenlit the spin-off, as well as also announcing that John Lithgow would replace Reubens as the voice of the White Rabbit. On May 14, 2013, ABC announced that the spin-off will air in the Thursday night timeslot instead of making it a fill-in for the parent series. "We really want to tell the story without having to worry about how to stretch it for five years," said Edward Kitsis. "This is not meant to be a 22-episode season. Whatever it ends up being, we'll have told a complete story ..." It was revealed in August at the TCA Summer Press Tour that, contrary to previous reports that more than 13 episodes were ordered straight out the gate, only the usual number of 13 episodes had been ordered. Edward Kitsis and Adam Horowitz commented "However many we wind up doing this season, what we're planning to do is tell a kind of complete tale with a beginning, middle and end" and added "If it does well [and] people like it, hopefully we'll come back and tell another adventure with this cast."

At Comic-Con 2013, it was announced that former Lost star, Naveen Andrews, would be joining the cast as the villain Jafar. It was announced in September that Keith David and Iggy Pop would also be included on the cast, as the Cheshire Cat and Caterpillar respectively. Iggy Pop will be a replacement for Roger Daltrey, who voiced the character originally as a guest star on Once Upon a Time. Barbara Hershey reprised her role as the Queen of Hearts in one episode.

Episodes

Reception
Rotten Tomatoes gave the series an approval rating of 59% based on 27 reviews, with an average rating of 6.03/10. The site's critical consensus reads "Once Upon a Time in Wonderland is attractive to the eye and pleasantly narrated, but it loses some luster due to a jumbled story and Wonderland's unlikable inhabitants." The series has a score of 59/100 on Metacritic based on 23 critics, indicating "mixed or average reviews". 

Common Sense Media rated the show 4 out of 5 stars, stating : "Parents need to know that, similar to its parent series, Once Upon a Time, Once Upon a Time in Wonderland extrapolates on familiar fairy tales and stories in creative and often mature ways. This one has its roots in Lewis Carroll's classic tale Alice's Adventures in Wonderland, but it incorporates other fantasy characters from unrelated stories as well. Despite its relationship to stories synonymous with childhood, this isn't a show for young kids, thanks to plenty of violence of both the traditional kind (knives, swordplay, and fistfights) and the magical kind. Danger lurks around every corner, and the characters' double-crossing and changing loyalties are part of the fun, but they will be confusing for some young viewers. Sex is less of an issue, although some female characters' attire –- the voluptuous Red Queen's in particular –- is designed to draw attention to certain curvy areas. The bottom line? Even though the cast of characters seems to contradict this dark show's target at an older audience, it's a tantalizing blend of action and drama with ties to stories you and your teens will have fun recalling from your own childhood".

Mary McNamara of the Los Angeles Times gave the show a positive review writing: "There is plenty of that—the good, the beautiful and the etc. Some of it is conjured by CG magic (the Red Queen's palace is splendid, and the White Rabbit's ears a masterwork), and some by just good storytelling and performer chemistry, which Lowe and Socha have in abundance. Add to that a smattering of witty dialogue, clever character twists and, of course, the Victo-goth steampunk look, and ABC has another shot at redefining the family hour." David Wiegand of the San Francisco Chronicle wrote that while the plot was "a little overstuffed", "the special effects, crisp direction and high-octane performances keep us interested enough to follow Alice down the rabbit hole." Brian Lowry of Variety gave the show a mixed review: "Wonderland is equally handsome [as Once Upon a Time], but behind those virtual sets lurk many potential flaws. An appealing Alice certainly helps matters, but past performance reduces the likelihood of a fairy-tale ending."

Ratings

Accolades

Broadcast
In Canada, the City network simulcasted the ABC broadcast as it debuted in October.

Home media
Episodes were released for purchase through the iTunes Store, Vudu and Amazon Prime. It became available to stream on Disney+ on November 27, 2020.

References

External links
 

 
2010s American drama television series
2013 American television series debuts
2014 American television series endings
American Broadcasting Company original programming
American action adventure television series
American fantasy television series
American television spin-offs
English-language television shows
High fantasy television series
Television about magic
Nonlinear narrative television series
Television series about parallel universes
Period television series
Romantic fantasy television series
Serial drama television series
Television series by ABC Studios
Television shows filmed in Vancouver
American television series with live action and animation
Television shows based on Alice in Wonderland
Television shows set in London
Television shows based on fairy tales
Witchcraft in television
American fantasy drama television series